Lolo is a unisex given name. People named Lolo include:

 Lolo Arziki (born 1992), Cape Verdean filmmaker and activist
 Lolo Fakaosilea (born 1995), Australian rugby union player
 Lolo Lui (born 1982), Samoan rugby player
 Lolo Letalu Matalasi Moliga, American Samoan politician, former educator, and businessman
 Lolo Soetoro (1935-1987), stepfather of Barack Obama
 Lolo Waka (born 1986), South African rugby union footballer
 Lolo Letalu Matalasi, known as Lolo Matalasi Moliga (born 1947), American Samoan politician
 Lolo Cecilia Ezeilo, Nigerian politician, lawyer, philanthropist and television presenter

Mononym
Lolo (singer), (stylized as LOLO), stagename of Lauren Pritchard (born 1987), American singer, songwriter and actress
Loló (footballer, born 1981), nickname of Lourenço Tomás Cuxixima (born 1981), Angolan footballer
Lolo (footballer, born 1984), nickname of Manuel Jesús Ortiz Toribio (born 1984), Spanish footballer
Lolo (footballer, born 1993), nickname of Manuel Coronado Pla (born 1993), Spanish footballer

As a nickname 
 Lolo Escobar, nickname of Manuel María Escobar Rodríguez (born 1976), Spanish football manager and player
 Lolo Ferrari, nickname of Ève Valois (1963–2000), French model and actress
 Lolo, nickname of Manuel Lozano Garrido (1920–1971), Spanish journalist and author
 Lolo González, nickname of Emmanuel González Rodríguez (born 1991), Spanish professional footballer 
 Lolo Ibern, nickname of Manuel Ibern Alcalde (born 1946), Spanish water polo player
 Lolo, nickname of Karisma Kapoor (born 1974), Bollywood actress
 Lolo Jones, nickname of Lori Susan Jones (born 1982), American hurdler and bobsledder
 Lolo Rico, nickname of María Dolores Rico Oliver (1935 – 2019), Spanish writer, television producer, screenwriter and journalist
 Lolo Sainz, nickname of Manuel Sainz Márquez (born 1940), Spanish former basketball player and coach
 Lolo, nickname of Lauren Silver (born 1987), American water polo player
 Loló Soldevilla, nickname of Dolores Soldevilla Nieto (1901–1971), Cuban visual artist
 Lolo Villalobos, nickname of Jose D. Villalobos y Olivera (1913-1997), Cuban politician
 Lolo Zouaï, nickname of Laureen Rebeha Zouaï (born 1995), French-American musician

See also

Lolo (disambiguation)
LØLØ
Lo' Lo' Mohd Ghazali